Ross Stephens (born 28 May 1985) is a Welsh footballer who plays for Cymru North club Llanidloes Town.

Career
Stephens rejoined Aberystwyth Town F.C. in January 2015 from Prestatyn Town, and made an instant impact scoring a Goal of the Month Contender against Newtown A.F.C. with a stunning left-footed volley in his first game back at the club. He made 7 Welsh Premier League Appearances for Aberystwyth in the 2014/15 season scoring twice and setting up two goals in the UEFA Europa League Play Off Semi Finals win over Connah's Quay Nomads F.C., and also played in the Final against Newtown. Ross received national publicity that week as the Final took place the day after his wedding, at which his Best Man was Aberystwyth teammate Chris Venables.

30 year old Ross had joined Prestatyn from Newtown in June 2010, making the Seasiders his sixth Welsh Premier League club at the age of 25, and he enjoyed a successful time at Bastion Gardens including a Welsh Cup Final victory in 2013 and a four-game UEFA Europa League run a few months later. He joined Newtown in the summer of 2009 after leaving Aber, having made 13 (+3) appearances for the Seasiders. Stephens scored a creditable five goals in his first spell in Black and Green, but was cup-tied for Aber's Welsh Cup run, which affected his chances at Park Avenue. Stephens had joined Aber in January 2009 after a successful spell at Welshpool Town F.C., having joined in 2007 after playing 14 matches and scoring 1 goal for Rhyl. He became John Hulse's first signing of 2007 when he joined the Lilywhites from Caersws F.C. in January after a number of excellent performances for the Bluebirds. Ross, signed permanently for Micky Evans' Caersws in June 2005, after a loan spell at the Recreation Ground in 2003. The Llanidloes-born player was released by Shrewsbury at the end of the 2004/05 season after a loan period at Redditch United. He is a talented player with excellent passing and dribbling ability and also has a strong eye for goal. Ross has carved out an excellent reputation in the WPL, having scored 78 goals in 309 appearances

References

External links
Ross Stephens, Welsh Premier League profile

Welsh footballers
English Football League players
Shrewsbury Town F.C. players
1985 births
Living people
People from Llanidloes
Prestatyn Town F.C. players
Aberystwyth Town F.C. players
Newtown A.F.C. players
Welshpool Town F.C. players
Rhyl F.C. players
Caersws F.C. players
Cymru Premier players
Association football midfielders
Llanidloes Town F.C. players